Wilfred L. "Bill" Durkee Jr. (July 14, 1921 – April 3, 2006) was an American professional basketball player. He played for the Minneapolis Lakers in the National Basketball League during the 1947–48 season.

Durkee attended the University of California, Berkeley and competed for their football, basketball, and track teams. His collegiate career was interrupted by World War II, where he was stationed in the Pacific. In 1954 he moved to Las Vegas, Nevada and worked at a nuclear test site.

References

1921 births
2006 deaths
American men's basketball players
United States Army personnel of World War II
Basketball players from Oakland, California
Berkeley High School (Berkeley, California) alumni
California Golden Bears football players
California Golden Bears men's basketball players
California Golden Bears men's track and field athletes
Forwards (basketball)
Guards (basketball)
Minneapolis Lakers players